Londell Smith better known by 
his stage name Nikko London, is an American television personality, singer and record producer. He is best known on the VH1's reality show Love & Hip Hop: Atlanta.

Career
In 2011 Nikko started working on a new project with Margeaux, called Invaderz. The duo released their dubstep mixtape Just Landed in the fall of that year.

In 2014, a sex tape featuring Nikko and Love & Hip Hop: Atlanta star Mimi Faust, was released through Vivid Entertainment entitled Scandal in Atlanta. It has become one of the most popular sex tapes released by the pornography company. It was nominated for an AVN Award for Best Celebrity Sex Tape in 2015, losing out to Tila Tequila. Nikko and Faust had stated that their luggage containing the sex tape was stolen and the tape was sent to Vivid Entertainment through an anonymous source.

Discography

Mixtapes

Singles

Filmography

Film

Television

References

Living people
20th-century African-American male singers
African-American record producers
Record producers from New York (state)
Participants in American reality television series
21st-century American singers
21st-century American male singers
21st-century African-American male singers